Sekhukhune is one of the 5 districts of Limpopo province of South Africa. The seat of Sekhukhune is Groblersdal. The majority of its 1,076,840 inhabitants speak Sepedi (2011 Census). The district code is DC47.

This district is named after the natural region of Sekhukhuniland. Sekhukhuneland is named after the Pedi King Sekhukhune, who succeeded Sekwati in 1860 or 1861.

Geography

Neighbours 
Sekhukhune is surrounded by:
 Capricorn (DC35) to the north
 Mopani (DC33) to the east
 Ehlanzeni (DC32) to the south-east
 Nkangala (DC31) to the south 
 Waterberg (DC36) to the north-west

Local municipalities 
The district contains the following local municipalities:

Demographics
The following statistics are from the 2001 census.

Gender

Ethnic group

Age

Politics

Election results 
Election results for Sekhukhune in the South African general election, 2004. 
 Population 18 and over: 484 867 [50.13% of total population] 
 Total votes: 318 986 [32.98% of total population] 
 Voting % estimate: 65.79% votes as a % of population 18 and over

2016 Local Election results for Sekhukhune District Municipality

African National Congress: 169 604 ||68.63%

Economic Freedom Fighters:48 228 ||19.51%

Democratic Alliance:13 368 ||5.41%

Pan African Congress :1 322 ||0.53%

Azanian People's Organisation:2 103 ||0.65%

Freedom Front Plus :1 097 ||0.44%

See also
 Municipal Demarcation Board

References

External links
 Sekhukhune District Municipality

District municipalities of Limpopo
Sekhukhune District Municipality